Trouble Man is a soundtrack and the twelfth studio album by American soul singer Marvin Gaye, released on December 8, 1972, on Motown-subsidiary label Tamla Records. As the soundtrack to the 1972 Blaxploitation film of the same name, the Trouble Man soundtrack was a more contemporary move for Gaye, following his politically charged album What's Going On.  This was the first album to be written and produced solely by Gaye.  The only other album recorded under his full creative control was In Our Lifetime, released in 1981.

Recording

Following the success of What's Going On, Marvin Gaye had not only won creative control, but a renewed $1 million contract with Motown Records subsidiary Tamla had made the musician the most profitable R&B artist of all time.

Signing the contract in early 1972, Gaye sought to take advantage of his opportunities. Bolstered by the successes of film soundtracks such as Shaft and Superfly, Motown offered the musician a chance to compose his own film soundtrack after winning rights to produce the crime thriller, Trouble Man.

Unlike Isaac Hayes and Curtis Mayfield, who mixed social commentary with sexual songs in their respective soundtracks, Gaye chose to focus primarily on the film's character, "Mister T", producing and composing both the film's score while entirely producing the film's soundtrack, which was recorded at Motown Studios (or "Hitsville West") in Hollywood.

Following the closing of Detroit's Hitsville USA studios in 1972, Motown had primarily moved its location to Los Angeles, where Gaye also relocated while he recorded the Trouble Man album. Gaye invited several musicians, including some from the Funk Brothers and musicians from Hamilton Bohannon's band.

Gaye would compose five different versions of the title track, including an alternate vocal version, which was used primarily for the film's intro. The alternate version featured Gaye double-tracking two lead vocal parts into one, overlaying his falsetto vocals with his tenor. The single version, which was also featured on the soundtrack, would feature a single lead vocal take. The other three versions were put on the album as instrumentals with Gaye providing synthesizer keyboards while saxophone solos (and occasionally guitar) accompany him.

The only other songs in which Gaye vocalized harmonies or performed lead vocals included "Poor Abbey Walsh", "Cleo's Apartment", "Life is a Gamble", "Don't Mess with Mister T" and "There Goes Mister T".

Critical reception

Bolstered by the hit success of the title track, which returned Gaye to a blues format reaching number 4 on the Soul Chart and number 7 on the Pop Charts, respectively, the album followed in December where it reached the top 20 of the Billboard 200, peaking at number 12. On Cashbox and Record World Magazines Charts the album even reached the Top 5, hitting almost as high as its monumental predecessor What‘s Going On, eighteen months earlier.

It would become Gaye's only soundtrack and film score. Critics gave the album favorable reviews while sometimes comparing Gaye's soundtrack efforts to that of Hayes' and Mayfield's. Following this, other R&B musicians would produce soundtracks of their own, including James Brown, Barry White and fellow Motown acts, Willie Hutch and Edwin Starr.

In popular culture
In the 2014 film Captain America: The Winter Soldier, Sam Wilson recommends the album as essential listening to Steve Rogers, who had until recently been frozen in ice since the Second World War: Wilson says it's "everything you missed jammed into one album". Towards the end of the film the titular track is playing on an iPhone.

In the episode "Power Broker" of the 2021 Disney+ series The Falcon and the Winter Soldier, Wilson notices that Bucky Barnes has the same pocket notebook and mentions that he had recommended the album to Rogers. When Barnes does not seem to share the same level of enthusiasm for the album, Baron Helmut Zemo enthuses flamboyantly about the album, telling Barnes that it is "...a masterpiece. Complete. Comprehensive. It captures the African-American experience", much to Wilson's amazement. The episode aired on Marvin Gaye's birthday.

Track listing
All songs written by Marvin Gaye.

Original LP
Side One
"Main Theme from Trouble Man (2)" – 2:30
"'T' Plays It Cool" – 4:27
"Poor Abbey Walsh" – 4:13
"The Break In (Police Shoot Big)" – 1:57
"Cleo's Apartment" – 2:10
"Trouble Man" – 3:49
"Theme from Trouble Man" – 2:01

Side Two
"'T' Stands for Trouble" – 4:48
"Main Theme from Trouble Man (1)" – 3:52
"Life Is a Gamble" – 2:32
"Deep-in-It" – 1:25
"Don't Mess with Mister 'T'" – 3:04
"There Goes Mister 'T'" – 1:37

2012 Reissue
Disc one (bonus tracks)
Main Theme From Trouble Man (2) (Alternate Take With Strings) 	
"T" Plays It Cool (Unedited) 	
Poor Abbey Walsh, Part 2 (Take 1) 	
Poor Abbey Walsh, Part 2 (Take 2) 	
Trouble Man (Extended Version) 	
Theme From Trouble Man (Vocal Version) 	
"T" Stands For Trouble (Unedited Vocal Version) 	
"T" Stands For Trouble (Alternate Version) 	
Main Theme From Trouble Man (Vocal Version) 	

Disc two (Original Film Score)
Trouble Man 	
Poor Hall 	
"T" Plays It Cool 	
Cadillac Interlude / Cleo's Apartment 	
Man Tied Up / Jimmy's West / Conversation With Cleo 	
Crap Game (A.K.A. The Break In) / Getting Rid Of Body / Talking To Angel 	
Outside Police Station 	
Bowling Alley / Parking Lot 	
Stick Up 	
Cleaners / Cleo 	
Closing Jimmy's 	
Police Break In 	
"T" Cleans Up / Police Station 	
Packing Up / Jimmy Gets Worked / Saying Goodbye / "T" Breaks In / Movie Theater 	
Car Ride / Looking For Pete 	
Parking Garage / Elevator 	
Penthouse 	
Getting Pete
My Name Is "T" / End Credits 	
"T" At The Cross (film band bonus)

Personnel

Musicians
Marvin Gaye –  vocals, drums, keyboards, piano, synthesizers, producer, arranger (9)
Trevor Lawrence –  alto, tenor and baritone saxophones
Dale Oehler –  horn & rhythm arrangements (track 9)
Eli Fountain –   alto saxophone
Marty Montgomery –   soprano saxophone
Gene Page –  strings (track 9)
Robert O. Ragland –  piano, string arrangements (track 7)
James Anthony Carmichael –  horn arrangements (track 7)
 Nesbert Stick Hooper - drums
 Leon Ndugu Chancler - drums
 Ray Parker Jr - guitar
 David T.Walker - guitar

Production
Dale Oehler – arranger (tracks 1, 6)
Gene Page – arranger  (9)
Jack Hayes – arranger  (3, 10–13)
J.J. Johnson – arranger  (8)
Robert O. Ragland  – arranger (4–5)
Leo Shuken – arranger  (3, 10–13)
Jerry Long – arranger  (2)

References

External links
 

Albums produced by Marvin Gaye
Albums arranged by Gene Page
1972 soundtrack albums
Jazz-funk albums
Marvin Gaye soundtracks
Tamla Records soundtracks
Albums recorded at Hitsville U.S.A.
Thriller film soundtracks